The Traveling Salesman is a 1916 American silent comedy film directed by Joseph Kaufman, written by James Forbes, and starring Frank McIntyre, Doris Kenyon, Harry Northrup, Russell Bassett, Julia Stuart, and Harry Blakemore. It was released on December 17, 1916, by Paramount Pictures.

Premise
A man traveling home for Christmas gets stuck in a small town and finds romance with a woman operating the telegraph.

Cast
Frank McIntyre as Bob Blake
Doris Kenyon as Beth Elliot
Harry Northrup as Franklin Royce
Russell Bassett as Martin Drury
Julia Stuart as Mrs. Babbitt
Harry Blakemore as Julius
James O'Neill, Jr. as Watts

Preservation
With no prints of The Traveling Salesman located in any film archives, it is a lost film.

References

External links

 
 

1916 films
American silent feature films
1910s English-language films
Silent American comedy films
1916 comedy films
Paramount Pictures films
Films directed by Joseph Kaufman
Lost American films
American black-and-white films
1916 lost films
Lost comedy films
1910s American films